Charis is a genus of the Riodinini tribe of metalmark butterflies (family Riodinidae). Nineteen species have been identified within the Charis cleonus complex (however, further analysis has revised this clade to contain 22 species) and eight species within the Charis gynaea group (clade). Charis butterflies are common in the Neotropics and often live in primary and secondary growth. The Charis cleonus group exhibits contemporary parapatric distributions throughout Amazonia and are thought to have speciated allopatrically; residing in "areas of endemism". Some evidence suggests that Charis (among other Riodininae groups) are reproductively isolated by mating preferences for different topographic areas and different times—of which, may have promoted speciation between the various groups.

Species
Charis cleonus complex
Charis major subgroup
Charis ma Harvey & Hall, 2002
Charis major (Lathy, 1932)
Charis matic Harvey & Hall, 2002
Charis cleonus subgroup
Charis ariquemes Harvey & Hall, 2002
Charis brasilia Harvey & Hall, 2002
Charis breves Harvey & Hall, 2002
Charis cacaulandia Harvey & Hall, 2002
Charis caryatis Hewitson, 1866
Charis cleonus (Stoll, 1781)
Charis cuiaba Harvey & Hall, 2002
Charis humaita Harvey & Hall, 2002
Charis ipiranga Harvey & Hall, 2002
Charis iquitos Harvey & Hall, 2002
Charis manicore Harvey & Hall, 2002
Charis manu Harvey & Hall, 2002
Charis maues Harvey & Hall, 2002
Charis negro Harvey & Hall, 2002
Charis palcazu Harvey & Hall, 2002
Charis rocana Harvey & Hall, 2002
Charis santarem Harvey & Hall, 2002
Charis tapajos Harvey & Hall, 2002
Charis tefe Harvey & Hall, 2002
Charis gynaea group 
Charis barnesi Hall & Harvey, 2001
Charis callaghani Hall & Harvey, 2001
Charis gallardi Hall & Harvey, 2001
Charis gynaea (Godart, 1824)
Charis nicolayi Hall & Harvey, 2001
Charis smalli Hall & Harvey, 2001
Charis zama Bates, 1868

References 

Riodininae